Lockhartia micrantha is a species of orchid native to Nicaragua, Costa Rica, Panama and Colombia.

References

micrantha
Orchids of Central America
Orchids of South America
Plants described in 1852